An electromod is a vehicle that has been restored and modified by converting its drivetrain to operate as an electric vehicle (EV). The term is a portmanteau of electrification and restomod, itself a portmanteau of restoration and modification, a process which traditionally has been associated with classic cars. Most electromods are one-off custom vehicles performed by specialty repair shops and hobbyists, but starting in the late 2010s, automobile manufacturers have been building their own electromods, sometimes with the assistance of specialty shops, to publicize their shift to battery electric powertrains and to build interest in crate engine EV drivetrain products.

History

Hobbyists have been converting cars originally powered by internal combustion engines to EVs since at least the 1960s. Historically, these used existing technology such as surplus aircraft starter motors and lead-acid batteries; these efforts were driven by ecological and financial reasons to increase efficiency and avoid using fossil fuels, with renewed interest piqued by the oil crises in 1973 and again in 1979. However, the converted EV powertrain range and power usually suffered compared to the original vehicle. Multiple books were written to document and guide these conversions in the late 1970s and 1980s, including The Complete Book of Electric Vehicles (Shacket, 1979), How to Convert to an Electric Car (Lucas & Riess, 1980), Convert It (Brown & Prange, 1993), and Build Your Own Electric Vehicle (Brant, 1994).

The increasing popularity of hybrid and battery electric vehicles since the 1990s and the turn of the 21st century along with tightening emissions mandates have spurred the development of more powerful electric traction motors and improved battery chemistries giving increased energy storage density, resulting in electric vehicles with still-limited range but with power comparable to conventional automobiles and trucks. In 2012, Rimac Automobili showed off its 1984 BMW E30 that had been restored and repowered with an electric drivetrain by breaking EV acceleration records. With electrified drivetrains now becoming more readily available through recycling crashed EVs, a market has developed for electromod conversions of classic and replica cars. Although some owners have commissioned electromod conversions of sports cars, several automotive journalists have argued the quiet, smooth characteristics of an EV drivetrain are better suited to luxury cars.

Many non-factory electromods are implemented by extracting and adapting the drivetrain or individual components (traction motor(s), battery, controller, and inverter) from an existing mass-produced EV, such as Tesla. In October 2019 there were no purpose-built crate engine EV kits available commercially, but such projects were in development. For example, EV West announced their Revolt Tesla Crate Motor in 2020, which married an electric traction motor from a Tesla with a gear reduction unit and ended in a universal joint yoke, a suitable interface for a driveshaft. Mechanically, the motor is fitted with mounts compatible with Chevrolet small-block engines to take advantage of numerous small-block repower kits.

The term electromod was coined around 2020 and serves a generic trademark for the restomod and electrification process. In 2021, the Opel Manta GSe ElektroMOD was unveiled by Opel as an electrified restomod of the Manta A; Opel stated the name was meant both to recall the Opel Elektro GT sports EV of 1971 and to describe the modern drivetrain and restomod of the original Manta. The resulting electromod attracted significant press attention and was used to publicize the electrification of Opel's lineup.

Examples

Early conversions

In the mid-1960s, General Motors demonstrated vehicles that had been repowered with AC induction traction motors, including the ElectroVair I and II, using 1964 and 1966 Chevrolet Corvair chassis, respectively, and the ElectroVan, built on a 1966 GMC HandiVan.

In August 1968, students from Caltech and MIT held "The Great Electric Car Race", with an EV-converted 1968 Chevrolet Corvair departing Cambridge for Pasadena while the CalTech "Voltswagen" (a converted 1958 Microbus) raced for Cambridge; the winner was the Voltswagen, which finished the trip in 210 hours and 3 minutes. Although the Voltswagen finished after the MIT Corvair, it was declared the winner when penalties were assessed to the MIT team for towing the Corvair to the finish after accidentally destroying its traction motor. Battery heat management during charging stops was an issue for both teams, which resorted to cooling the batteries with ice at each stop.

AM General converted 350 DJ-5E Electrucks for the United States Postal Service; these delivery vehicles used an EV powertrain to eliminate a mobile source of pollution. 300 were placed into operation in southern California starting in 1975.

The batteries used a zinc-nickel oxide chemistry to increase energy density. At the time, GM President Pete Estes said the new chemistry "will make electric vehicles viable alternatives to gasoline or diesel cars and trucks". The batteries had an estimated life of 300 recharge cycles, with an estimated replacement cost ranging from US$800 to $2000.

The Prestolite DC motor developed  and the battery consisted of sixteen six-volt cells, connected and switched to provide 24 or 48 volts when discharging to the motor, or 48 volts when charging. Total capacity was 138 A-hr. U.S. Electricar was founded as Solar Electric Engineering, Inc. in 1976.

Non-manufacturer

East Coast Defender and Electric Classic Cars demonstrated a Tesla EV-sourced powertrain conversion of a 1969–96 Range Rover Classic to Motor Trend in 2021.

Manufacturer
In 2018, Chevrolet Performance advanced an "electric crate motor" concept with the unveiling of the eCOPO Camaro at that year's SEMA show. The eCOPO Camaro was a 2019 COPO Camaro which was equipped with a pair of BorgWarner HVH250-150 motor assemblies instead of the conventional piston engine. The electric traction motor essentially served as a drop-in replacement with the same bellhousing bolt pattern and crankshaft flange as the LS engine family, so the car retained the same transmission, driveshaft, and axles as the conventional COPO Camaro. It was developed in partnership with Hancock and Lane Racing and Pat McCue.

At the 2019 SEMA show, Chevrolet continued to develop the EV crate motor idea, following up with the E-10 Concept, which used the powertrains from two Bolt EVs repackaged into in a restored 1962 C-10 pickup truck.

For SEMA 2020, Chevrolet showcased the "Electric Connect and Cruise" eCrate package, which included the main drivetrain components of a single Bolt EV (motor, battery, controller, and inverter), and was demonstrated as a retrofit to a restored 1977 K5 Blazer. The kit was scheduled to go on sale in the second half of 2021. In this application, the Bolt motor was modified by removing the differential and reduction gear unit, then fitting an adapter plate and crank flange, allowing it to bolt to a conventional transmission. Together with the controller and inverter, the motor occupies approximately the same space as the small-block V8 it replaced; the  battery was bolted into the cargo area. In general, the battery presents a greater challenge for packaging, which is why the initial development has focused on trucks. , the eCrate package was still being explored as a "future business opportunity", according to Chevrolet Vice President Scott Bell. Chevrolet plans to release the Ultium eCrate Package in mid-2023.

In November 2021, Ford Performance released the "Eluminator"  crate EV motor, which was the same traction motor used in the Ford Mustang Mach-E GT Performance Edition and used to power the 1978 F-100 Eluminator restomod pickup truck. As of 3 November 2021, it was available for pre-order but not yet shipping. Final assembly and integration of the F-100 Eluminator was performed by McCue-Lane electric Race Cars (MLe), a shop operated as a partnership between Pat McCue and racer Jeff Lane.

Hyundai Motor Corporation won praise from the press for its Heritage Series electromods presented in 2021, which include a Pony and Grandeur, both restored and repowered as EVs and carrying that brand's "Parametric Pixel" design language applied to its Ioniq sub-brand. Powertrain details were not supplied. Additional factory electromods shown recently include conversions of a Maserati Shamal (November 2020), the Manta A previously mentioned (May 2021), and Renault 5 Diamant and Turbo 3E one-offs (2022).

At the 2023 Tokyo Auto Salon, Toyota demonstrated two AE86-based electromod concepts: the BEV Concept, which is a Corolla Levin equipped with the electric motor from the Tundra i-Force Max hybrid coupled to the original manual transmission, drawing from a storage battery taken from the plug-in version of the Prius hybrid; and the H2 Concept, which is a Sprinter Trueno that retains its internal combustion 4A-GE engine, modified to run on hydrogen fuel instead of gasoline.

References

External links
 

Conservation and restoration of vehicles
Vehicle modification